Events in the year 1896 in Brazil.

Incumbents

Federal government 
President: Prudente de Morais
Vice-President: Manuel Vitorino

Governors 
 Alagoas: Jose Vieira Peixoto 
 Amazonas: Eduardo Gonçalves Ribeiro (till 23 July); Fileto Pires Ferreira (from 23 July)
 Bahia: Rodrigues Lima then Luís Viana
 Ceará: Antônio Nogueira Accioli (till 12 July); Antônio Nogueira Accioli (from 12 July)
 Goiás: Francisco Leopoldo Rodrigues Jardim
 Maranhão:
 till April 29: Alfredo Martins
 from April 29: Casimiro Vieira Jr
 Mato Grosso: Manuel José Murtinho
 Minas Gerais: Bias Fortes
 Pará: Lauro Sodré
 Paraíba: 
 till October 22: Álvaro Lopes Machado
 from October 22: Antônio Alfredo Mello
 Paraná: 
 Francisco Xavier da Silva
 Santos Andrade
 Pernambuco:
 till April 7: Alexandre José Barbosa Lima
 from April 7: Joaquim Correia de Araújo
 Piauí:
 till July 1: Coriolano de Carvalho e Silva
 from July 1: Raimundo Artur de Vasconcelos
 Rio Grande do Norte: 
 till March 25: Pedro de Albuquerque Maranhão
 from March 25: Joaquim Ferreira Chaves
 Rio Grande do Sul: Júlio Prates de Castilhos
 Santa Catarina:
 São Paulo: 
 Sergipe:

Vice governors 
 Rio de Janeiro: 
 Rio Grande do Norte:
 São Paulo:

Events
4 November - The Brazilian government sends 100 men under the command of Lieutenant Manuel da Silva Pires Ferreira to intervene in the Canudos region.
21 November - The War of Canudos begins with an attack by the small force led by Pires Ferreira.  They are fiercely counter-attacked by a band of 500 armed men; the Brazilian force retreats, after incurring severe losses and killing 150 of the attackers, many of whom are armed only with machetes, primitive lances and axes.
Manuel Ferraz de Campos Sales becomes governor of São Paulo.

Births
16 August - Cyro de Freitas Valle, lawyer (died 1969)
19 August - Alda Garrido, actress (died 1970)
20 September - Eduardo Gomes, politician and military figure (died 1981)
17 December - Gustavo Corção, Roman Catholic writer (died 1978)

Deaths
16 September - Antônio Carlos Gomes, composer (born 1836)

References

 
1890s in Brazil
Brazil
Years of the 19th century in Brazil